Fernando Emanuel Dening (born 4 July 1988 in Goya) is an Argentine football striker who plays for Club Agropecuario Argentino.

Career
Dening came through the Newell's Old Boys youth development system to make his debut on 21 August 2009 coming on as a 74th-minute substitute in a 0–1 away win against Independiente. He appeared as a substitute in several more games during the Apertura 2009 tournament.

External links
 

1988 births
Living people
People from Goya
Argentine footballers
Argentine expatriate footballers
Association football forwards
Sportspeople from Corrientes Province
Newell's Old Boys footballers
Central Córdoba de Rosario footballers
San Martín de San Juan footballers
Club Atlético Tigre footballers
Cerro Porteño players
Yeni Malatyaspor footballers
Enosis Neon Paralimni FC players
Club Agropecuario Argentino players
Argentine Primera División players
Primera Nacional players
Primera B Metropolitana
Süper Lig players
Paraguayan Primera División players
Argentine people of German descent
Argentine expatriate sportspeople in Turkey
Argentine expatriate sportspeople in Paraguay
Argentine expatriate sportspeople in Cyprus
Expatriate footballers in Turkey
Expatriate footballers in Paraguay
Expatriate footballers in Cyprus